Gary Hoey is the title of the 1995 self-titled release by instrumental rock guitarist Gary Hoey.

Track listing

High-Top Bop (Gary Hoey, Lori Weinhouse)
Get A Grip (Gary Hoey, Lori Weinhouse)
Strat Strut (Gary Hoey)
Mr. Mover (Gary Hoey)
City Sunrise (Gary Hoey, Lori Weinhouse)
Says Who? (Gary Hoey, Lori Weinhouse)
Stack Attack (Gary Hoey)
Rainbow Warrior (Gary Hoey, Lori Weinhouse)
Lost Dreams (Gary Hoey)

Personnel
Gary Hoey: Guitar
Nick South: Bass
Frankie Banali: Drums, Percussion

Additional musicians:
Tony Franklin: Bass (on High-Top Bop)
Lori Weinhouse: Keyboards

Studio:
Engineered by: Sebastian Thorer
Additional engineering by: Jean-Marie Horvat
Mixed by: Jean-Marie Horvat
Mastered by: Bernie Grundman

References

1995 albums
Gary Hoey albums
Surfdog Records albums